Flushing Township is one of the sixteen townships of Belmont County, Ohio, United States. The 2010 census found 2,021 people in the township, of which 804 lived in unincorporated portions of the township.

Geography
Located in the northwestern corner of the county, it borders the following townships:
Moorefield Township, Harrison County - north
Athens Township, Harrison County - northeast
Wheeling Township - east
Union Township - southeast
Kirkwood Township - south
Londonderry Township, Guernsey County - west
Freeport Township, Harrison County - northwest

Two villages are located in Flushing Township: Flushing in the east, and Holloway in the north.

Name and history
It is the only Flushing Township statewide.

Flushing Township was organized in 1817. Flushing Township was originally settled chiefly by Quakers.

Government
The township is governed by a three-member board of trustees, who are elected in November of odd-numbered years to a four-year term beginning on the following January 1. Two are elected in the year after the presidential election and one is elected in the year before it. There is also an elected township fiscal officer, who serves a four-year term beginning on April 1 of the year after the election, which is held in November of the year before the presidential election. Vacancies in the fiscal officership or on the board of trustees are filled by the remaining trustees.

References

External links
County website

Townships in Belmont County, Ohio
1817 establishments in Ohio
Populated places established in 1817
Townships in Ohio